In April 623, the Islamic prophet Muhammad sent Ubaydah ibn al-Harith with a party of sixty armed Muhajirun (Muslim exiles in Medina) to the valley of Rabigh, in modern-day Saudi Arabia. They expected to intercept a Quraysh caravan that was returning from Syria under the protection of Abu Sufyan ibn Harb and 200 armed riders. The Muslim party travelled as far as the wells at Thanyat al-Murra, where Sa`d ibn Abi Waqqas shot an arrow at the Quraysh. This is known as the first arrow of Islam. Despite this surprise attack, "they did not unsheathe a sword or approach one another," and the Muslims returned empty-handed; however, two Meccans traders left their caravan, became Muslim, and went with the expedition back to Medina.

Timing
Some say that Ubaydah ibn al-Harith was the first to whom Muhammad gave a banner on a military expedition; others say Hamza was the first.

Some scholars assert that Muhammad sent out the expedition while he was in Al-Abwa' or upon his return to the Medina from the raid of Al-Abwa'.

See also
Muhammad
List of expeditions of Muhammad
Military career of Muhammad
Muslim–Quraysh War
Sa'd ibn Abi Waqqas

References

623
620s conflicts
Campaigns ordered by Muhammad
Muhammad in Medina